Tadhg Caech Ó Cellaigh was a King of Ui Maine within Ireland, who retired in 1476.

Upon the death of Aedh na gCailleach Ó Cellaigh in 1469, the Ui Maine elected two kings, ruling Iar Ui Maine (west) and Airthir Ui Maine (east) respectively. They were Tadhg Caech Ó Cellaigh of Airthir, and William Ó Cellaigh in the west. Upon the retirement of Tadhg in 1476, Uilliam became king of all Ui Maine, installing his brother, Donnchadh, as tainiste in Airthir.

See also
Kings of Uí Maine

References

 The Tribes and customs of Hy-Many, John O'Donovan, 1843
 The Parish of Ballinasloe, Fr. Jerome A. Fahey.
 The Surnames of Ireland, Edward MacLysaght, Dublin, 1978.
 A New History of Ireland - lists and genealogies, vol. 9, Oxford University Press, 1984.
 Dictionary of Irish Biography, pp. 592–94, Cambridge, 2010
 Annals of Ulster at CELT: Corpus of Electronic Texts at University College Cork
 Annals of Tigernach at CELT: Corpus of Electronic Texts at University College Cork
Revised edition of McCarthy's synchronisms at Trinity College Dublin.
 https://web.archive.org/web/20070711171122/http://www.chivalricorders.org/nobility/holyroman/hrebrit.htm[1]
 http://www.stirnet.com/main/index.php?option=com_wrapper&Itemid=79&startUrl=http://www.stirnet.com/HTML/genie/british/kk/kelly01.htm

People from County Galway
Kings of Uí Maine
15th-century Irish monarchs
Tadhg Caech